Kinyinya is a city in eastern Burundi, close to the border with Tanzania. It is located southwest of Gisuru and northeast of Mount Kikizi.

References
Fitzpatrick, M., Parkinson, T., & Ray, N. (2006) East Africa. Footscray, VIC: Lonely Planet.

Populated places in Burundi